Falj (also Romanized as Falaj; also known as Pal, Palḩ, and Palk) is a village in Khorramdarreh Rural District, in the Central District of Khorramdarreh County, Zanjan Province, Iran. At the 2006 census, its population was 722, in 149 families.

References 

Populated places in Khorramdarreh County